Rupandehi District, a part of Lumbini Province, is one of the seventy-seven districts of Nepal and covers an area of . The district headquarter is Bhairahawa. As per the national census 2011, the population of Rupandehi was 880,196.

Etymology 
Rupandehi is named after Rupadevi, the queen of King Suddhodana.

History
Lumbini, birthplace of Buddha, lies in Rupandehi district. Devdaha, the birthplace of Mayadevi (mother of Buddha), also lies in Rupandehi district.

Demographics
At the time of the 2011 Nepal census, Rupandehi District had a population of 880,196. Of these, 36.8% spoke Bhojpuri, 36.6% Nepali, 6.4% Awadhi, 6.3% Tharu, 4.2% Magar, 3.6% Maithili, 2.6% Urdu, 1.3% Newari, 1.2% Gurung, 0.5% Hindi, 0.1% Doteli, 0.1% Tamang and 0.1% other languages as their first language.

In terms of ethnicity/caste, 15.9% were Hill Brahmin, 10.7% Magar, 9.7% Tharu, 8.3% Musalman, 7.4% Yadav, 6.8% Chhetri, 3.7% Chamar/Harijan/Ram, 3.1% Kami, 2.9% Lodh, 2.5% Kewat, 2.3% Kahar, 2.1% Newar, 2.0% Dhobi, 2.0% Gurung, 2.0% Kurmi, 2.0% Mallaha, 1.6% Kathabaniyan, 1.5% Dusadh/Pasawan/Pasi, 1.4% Teli, 1.1% Damai/Dholi, 0.9% Koiri/Kushwaha, 0.8% Baraee, 0.8% Hajam/Thakur, 0.7% other Terai, 0.7% Thakuri, 0.6% Terai Brahmin, 0.5% Kalwar, 0.5% Lohar, 0.5% Sanyasi/Dasnami, 0.5% Sarki, 0.4% Gaderi/Bhedidar, 0.4% Halwai, 0.4% Kumal, 0.2% Badhaee, 0.2% Bengali, 0.2% other Dalit, 0.2% Kayastha, 0.2% Marwadi, 0.2% Musahar, 0.2% Tamang, 0.1% Badi, 0.1% Chhantyal, 0.1% Dhandi, 0.1% Dhankar/Darikar, 0.1% Dhunia, 0.1% foreigners, 0.1% Gharti/Bhujel, 0.1% Majhi, 0.1% Mali, 0.1% Rai, 0.1% Rajbhar, 0.1% Rajput, 0.1% Thakali and 0.1% others.

In terms of religion, 86.2% were Hindu, 8.2% Muslim, 4.6% Buddhist, 0.7% Christian, 0.1% Bon and 0.1% others.

In terms of literacy, 69.6% could read and write, 2.3% could only read and 28.0% could neither read nor write.

At the time of 2011 A.D National population and Housing census 2011 was reported that total population of Rupandehi district was 880,196 . and Male=432,193 and Female=448,003 and total household was 163,916 .
Data Source: Central bureau of statistics Kathmandu, government of Nepal.

Administrative divisions
Rupandehi is divided into 16 local level units, in which 6 are urban municipality and 10 are Rural Municipality. Butwal is considered as a Sub-Metropolitan municipality.

Constituencies
Rupandehi is divided into 5 Parliamentary constituencies and 10 Provincial constituencies.

NGOs in Rupandehi Rupandehi is divided into 5 Parliamentary constituencies and 10 Provincial constituencies.

Constituencies
Rupandehi is divided into 5 Parliamentary constituencies and 10 Provincial constituencies.

Geography 
The district lies on the southern and western part of Nepal. On the East it shares border with Nawalparasi District, on West with Kapilvastu District, on North with Palpa District and on South with India. The elevation of the district lies between 100m to 1229m from sea level. The total area of the district is 1,360 km2 with 16.1% in Churia Range and rest in the Terai region.

Major rivers
Rupandehi has many rivers all of which flow from Northern mountains towards south into India.
 Tinau River
 Kothi River
 Sukhaira River
 Bagela River
 Rohini River
 Kanchan River
 Kacharar River
 Koili River
 Danav River
 Danda River
 Ghodaha
 Khadawa

Major lakes 
Gaidahawa lake (Gaidahawa)
Gajedi lake (Gajedi)
Nanda vauju lake (Chilhiya)
Sukaiiya lake

Climate

Praketeshwar Mahadev 
Praketeshwar Mandir is near of Lumbini Road. In months of Shrawan (late July and early August), there is a big crowded fair, quite popular among locals and people around the regions.

Nawa Durga Bhawani Mandir
It lies in Sainamaina-3, Murgiya. Many peoples visit there to worship Goddess Durga throughout the year. Many poojas are conducted timely. It is regularly repaired by the members involved in its development.

Lumbini 
Lumbini is the birthplace of Buddha on whose teachings Buddhism was founded. It is granted World Heritage status by UNESCO in 1997. Thousands of Buddhist monks, pilgrims and tourists visit Lumbini annually. The ongoing up-gradation of Gautam Buddha Airport into international airport is expected to increase the number of visitors. Mahinda Rajapakshe, President of Sri Lanka is one of the high-profile visitor of Lumbini.

Siddha Baba Mandir 
This is a temple dedicated to Shiva situated in border between Palpa and Rupandehi. There is a belief that Shiva grants the wishes of the devotees who visit the temple. There are two Siddha Baba Mandir adjacent to each other. One lies within Rupandehi and another in Palpa. Nonetheless, both Mandir are regarded as pilgrimages of equal importance.

Satiya Devi Temple and Satiya Mai Mandir

This is a temple dedicated to Devi Satiya situated in Patkhauli VDC, near Rohini Khola In Rupandehi. There is a belief that Real Lady grants the wishes of the devotees who visit the temple. There are a real Maya Devi Mandir and other is modified temple adjacent to each other. One lies within Rupandehi and another in Palpa. Nonetheless, both Mandir are regarded as a pilgrimage of equal importance. Due to the Godes beloved to visitors in Satiya Ban area. Actually, this temple is situated in the middle of Rohini Khola but now River is flowing west of Satiya Devi Temple and Satiya Bagaicha.

Manimukunda Sen Park 
Once a winter palace of King Manimukunda Sen, Manimukunda Sen Park is another major attraction in Rupandehi. The palace is not in shape but the ruins and antiquities of the majestic palace can still be found. It is situated in Butwal City and is popular for the picnic spots, zoo and the gardens inside the park. The greenery and the view of Rupandehi, Palpa and Kapilvastu districts is also another attraction in the park.

Parroha Bol Bam Dham 
It is the oldest Bol Bam Dham (pilgrimage and festival) in Nepal. The pilgrimage is dedicated to Shiva located in Sainamaina Municipality. Thousands of Shiva's devotees from various parts of the country and from neighboring States of India visit to worship the Shivalinga inside the Bol Bam Dham. The major inflow of pilgrims occurs during the Bol Bam. Bol Bam is an annual pilgrimage glorifying Shiva made in Shraavana in which devotees travel barefooted wearing saffron robes in routes to the dham.

Shankar Nagar Ban Bihar and Research Center 
Shankar Nagar Ban Bihar and Research Centre, simply referred as Ban Batika by locals is an attraction in Tilottama Municipality. The centre is maintained inside Shankarnagar Community Forest. It is visited for its picnic spots, zoo and garden.

 Chanchala Mai Mandir
 Jit Gadhi

Marchwari Devi Temple lies in Bogadi VDC of Rupandehi. It is a historical temple among the 24 previous VDC. The area surrounding this temple (now 18 VDCs) are named after this temple as Marchwar. The local people and peoples from INDIA, Uttar Pradesh visit there on specific occasions to celebrate childbirth, engagement and marriage ceremonies.

Chappiya Fish village 
Chappiya fish village resort has become an attraction in siyari municipality and has peoples visiting from many neighbouring municipalities. It provides various species of fish and mouth watering cuisines, and have the option of boating and fishing. It is located in Siyari Gaupalika which is about 12 kilometer west of Bhairahawa.

Pardasani mela 
It is one of the most popular mela held annually in butwal. It is related to business.

Major economic centers
 Butwal
 Siddharthanagar (Bhairahawa)
 Dhakdhai (industrial area)
 Lumbini (world Heritage Area, as tourism)
 Devdaha (miroduct area)
 Sainamaina (Murgiya for sports and tourism)
 Murgiya
 Manigram
 Chho.gen Never (grain products area)
 Kothihawa
 Lumbini
 Saljhandi
 Sauraha Pharsatikar
 Bhalwari
 Manglapur
 Bashgadi
 Jogada
 Divertole
 Sankarnagar
 Jogikuti
 Thutipipal
 semlar
 marchawar
 Chhapiya 
SEMARI (industrial area)

Non-profit organisations
 Center for Development and Disaster management (CDM-Nepal)
 NAMUNA Integrated Development Council (NAMUNA)
 Tarai Dalit Concern centre Nepal TDCC Nepal
 FSC Rupandehi
 Samriddhi Foundation
 Ma Bhagawiti Anurag Jagarn Samooh
 Astha Samuha 
 Brahmakumaris organization
 Biodiversity Conservancy Nepal
 Lilaram Kuntidevi Neupane Foundation
 Namaste Kids Nepal
 Seto Gurans Child Development Service Rupandehi
 Nepal Bikash Kendra Butwal -11,Rupandehi (Nepal Development Center)

Education 
Rupandehi is renowned at national level on education sector for its infrastructure and achievements. Jilla Shikshya Karyalaya, Rupandehi (District Education Office, Rupandehi) under Ministry of Education manages and govern the education in the district. Currently, it manages 745 educational institutions in the district. As per National Census 2011, the literacy rate of the district is 72%, where male literacy rate is 89% and female literacy rate is 62%. The literacy rate is above the national average.

Transportation 
Siddhartha Highway and Mahendra Highway connects Rupandehi with rest of the country. Gautam Buddha Airport connects Rupandehi with the rest of the country. It is the only airport in Lumbini. Currently it is being upgraded to make it an international airport. The late Prime Minister Sushil Koirala laid a foundations stone of the airport on January 15. It is expected to be completed by 2018 with an estimated budget of Rs 6.22 billion. North-West Civil Aviation Airport Construction Company of China is responsible for the construction of the airport.

West Nepal Bus Entrepreneurs' Association established in 2026 with the approval of District Administration Office is the major provider of transportation services for Rupandehi and the whole country.

Sports 
Cricket and football are the most popular sports in Rupandehi. Players in Rupandehi compete in domestic cricket tournaments as Region No. 4 Bhairahawa. Shakti Gauchan and Basanta Regmi are leading cricketers from Rupandehi who regularly play for the national team. Rupandehi XI represents Rupandehi in domestic football tournaments. Dipak Chhetri, Pukar Gahatraj, and Pradip Karki are notable footballer from Rupandehi.

References

 Shaha, Rishikesh (1992). Ancient and Medieval Nepal. Manohar Publications, New Delhi. .
 
 
 

 
Districts of Nepal established in 1962